Maxwell Philip Holt (born March 12, 1987) is an American professional volleyball player. He is a member of the US national team, and a bronze medalist at the Olympic Games Rio 2016. The 2014 World League and the 2015 World Cup winner. At the professional club level, he plays for Beijing BAIC Motor.

Career

National team
Holt was a member of the U.S. Junior Men's National Team from 2005-2007. He played in the Four Nations Tournament in 2005, the NORCECA Men's Junior Continental Championship in 2006, and the FIVB Volleyball Men's U21 World Championship where the team took seventh.
Holt joined the National Team in 2009, debuting in the Pan American Cup. In September 2013 USA, including Holt, won the NORCECA Championship. On July 20, 2014 he won the gold medal of World League 2014.

Honours

Clubs
 CEV Cup
  2014-15 – with Dynamo Moscow
 CEV Challenge Cup
  2012-13 – with Copra Elior Piacenza
 National championships
 2016-17  Italian SuperCup, with Azimut Modena
 2018-19  Italian SuperCup, with Azimut Modena
 2022-23  Chinese Championship, with Beijing BAIC Motor

Individual awards
 2013: FIVB World Grand Champions Cup – Best Middle Blocker
 2015: FIVB World League – Best Middle Blocker
 2019: FIVB Nations League – Best Middle Blocker
 2019: FIVB World Cup – Best Middle Blocker

See also
 List of Pennsylvania State University Olympians

References

External links

 Player profile at TeamUSA.org
 
 Player profile at LegaVolley.it 
 
 
 Player profile at Volleybox.net

1987 births
Living people
Sportspeople from Cincinnati
American men's volleyball players
Volleyball players at the 2016 Summer Olympics
Volleyball players at the 2020 Summer Olympics
Medalists at the 2016 Summer Olympics
Olympic bronze medalists for the United States in volleyball
American expatriate sportspeople in Italy
Expatriate volleyball players in Italy
American expatriate sportspeople in Russia
Expatriate volleyball players in Russia
American expatriate sportspeople in China
Expatriate volleyball players in China
Penn State Nittany Lions men's volleyball players
Blu Volley Verona players
Modena Volley players
Middle blockers